Notre Dame Academy Girls High School is a private, all-girls Catholic high school located in West Los Angeles, California, United States. Part of the Roman Catholic Archdiocese of Los Angeles, it was founded in 1949 by the Sisters of Notre Dame.

Description
The school offers 17 advanced placement classes and 12 honors classes.

Notable alumnae
 Lana Condor, Class of 2015, actress (To All the Boys I've Loved Before)
 Cathie Wood, Class of 1974, founder, CEO, and CIO of Ark Invest
 Linda Gray, Class of 1958, Emmy-nominated actress (Dallas)

Notes and references

External links

 

1949 establishments in California
Educational institutions established in 1949
Girls' schools in California
High schools in Los Angeles County, California
Rancho Park, Los Angeles
Roman Catholic secondary schools in Los Angeles County, California
West Los Angeles
Catholic secondary schools in California